The Feldsee (also Feldbergsee) is a lake in southern  Baden-Württemberg at the foot of the Feldberg east of Freiburg im Breisgau in Germany. It is part of the Southern Black Forest Nature Park.

Geology and earth history 
The Feldsee is a tarn, around 97,500 m2 in area and up to 32 metres deep. It was formed by glaciers of the last ice age. The largest tarn in the Black Forest, it is hemmed in on three sides by steep mountainsides up to  300 metres high. It is almost circular and has a diameter of between 350 and 370 metres. The lake formed after the melting of the ice sheet behind the lines of heaped-up glacial debris. The Seebach stream, which rises between the Feldberg and Seebuck in the Grüble, flows through the Feldsee, tumbling over the Feldsee Waterfall on the wall of the cirque, eventually becoming the Gutach at the far side of the Titisee. For several hundred thousand years this was the upper course of the ancient Danube (Urdonau), which flowed into the present-day Danube near Immendingen and, for the last several ten thousand years has formed a headstream of the Wutach, which flows into the Rhine.

Below the Feldsee, between the heaps of moraine, used to be another, smaller lake that, through the formation of peat has silted up to become the present-day, botanically valuable bog of Feldseemoor.

Nature conservation 
Currently there is a general ban on bathing in the Feldsee. This is in order to protect a rare underwater fern, the spiny quillwort (Isoetes echinospora), that thrives in water 1–2 metres deep and only occurs in Germany in the Feldsee and Lake Titisee. This plant grows in lakes with cool, very clear water that are low in nutrients. Around the Feldsee is a so-called Bannwald. This mixed forest is also protected and is allowed to grow naturally. It has been protected since 1937 and is the oldest nature reserve in Baden-Württemberg. The Feldsee Crags (Feldseefelsen) are out of bounds to climbers. The Feldberg rangers enforce these rules strictly. There are rare plants here like the alpine sow-thistle, Turk's cap lily, wolfsbane and sundew.

Recently, a new species of bacteria was discovered in the lake and subsequently scientifically described. This new species, Polynucleobacter campilacus is named after the lake. Currently, it is not known, if this species is endemic to the lake or possesses a geographically broader distribution. P. campilacus is remarkable because of its relatively small genome size.

Access 
There are no roads to the Feldsee; it can only be accessed on foot or by bicycle. The nearest car parks are 3–4 km away in Feldberg-Bärental (Wanderparkplatz Kunzenmoos), and on the Feldberg. The Feldsee is easily reached by bicycle from Alpersbach via the Rinken. The lake can be circumnavigated on a well-prepared path. 490 metres east of the Feldsee is the 300-year-old Raimartihof inn.

References

Literature 
 Der Feldberg im Schwarzwald. Subalpine Insel im Mittelgebirge; mit Beiträgen von A. Bogenrieder, E. Liehl, E. Oberdorfer, G. Osche, W. Wimmenauer et al. (Photography: H. & K. Rasbach). – publ.: Landesanstalt für Umweltschutz Baden-Württemberg, Karlsruhe, 1982, (vergr.)
 Der Schwarzwald. Beiträge zur Landeskunde; eds.: E. Liehl & W. D. Sick – 2nd edn., Verlag Konkordia, Bühl 1982, (vergr.)
 August Vetter: Feldberg im Schwarzwald, Selbstverlag der Gemeinde Feldberg (Schwarzwald), 1982/1996

External links 

 Legends about the Feldsee

Lakes of Baden-Württemberg
Tarns of the Black Forest
Breisgau-Hochschwarzwald
Baden
LFeldsee